The Abbey of Saint Scholastica or St. Scholastica's Abbey may refer to:

Abbey of Saint Scholastica, Subiaco, Italy
Abbey of Saint Scholastica, Teignmouth, England